Australimyzidae is a family of  flies (Diptera). There is 1 genus, containing 9 known species known from Australia and New Zealand and subantarctic surrounding islands. They have saprophagous larvae.

Species
 Australimyza
A. australensis (Mik, 1881)
A. glandulifera Brake & Mathis, 2007
A. kaikoura Brake & Mathis, 2007
A. longiseta Harrison, 1959
A. macquariensis (Womersley, 1937)
A. mcalpinei Brake & Mathis, 2007
A. salicorniae Harrison, 1959
A. setigera Harrison, 1959
A. victoria Brake & Mathis, 2007

References

 
Brachycera families